Nikolay Vasilev (born 10 January 1955) is a Bulgarian sailor. He competed in the Finn event at the 1980 Summer Olympics.

References

External links
 

1955 births
Living people
Bulgarian male sailors (sport)
Olympic sailors of Bulgaria
Sailors at the 1980 Summer Olympics – Finn
Place of birth missing (living people)